Guardian Pipeline is a small natural gas pipeline that brings gas from northern Illinois into Wisconsin.  It is owned by ONEOK Partners, G.P.  It is operated by ONEOK Partners, L.P. Its FERC code is 184.

References

External links
Pipeline Electronic Bulletin Board

Natural gas pipelines in the United States
Oneok
Energy infrastructure in Illinois
Energy infrastructure in Wisconsin
Natural gas pipelines in Illinois
Natural gas pipelines in Wisconsin